Roderick Coyne (born 1945, in Buckinghamshire) is an English artist and sculptor.

Education 

Coyne studied at Folkestone School of Art (1964–66), in the sculpture departments of Saint Martin's School of Art (1966–69) and the Royal College of Art (1969–72) alongside Richard Wentworth, Alison Wilding and Ismail Saray. During his studies he showed works in a major open air sculpture show in Holland Park (1972), with contemporary artists including early generation sculptors - Brian Kneale, Bernard Meadows, Kenneth Armitage, and new generation sculptors -Tim Head, Carl Plackman, Ismail Saray. Other early 'site specific' exhibitions included Trinity College, Cambridge (1971). He is a member of the Royal College of Art Society, the association of former graduates of the Royal College of Art. He contributed a number of articles concerning art education practice.

Teaching 

Coyne taught on the 'A' Course of the sculpture department at Saint Martin's School of Art from 1972 to 1980. He was also a visiting lecturer at Chelsea School of Art, Ravensbourne College of Art and Design, and Newport College of Art.

Exhibitions 

From 1980, the site-specific sculpture of Coyne's early work developed into large-scale photographically-based installations involving a synthesis of projection and print. (BBC Billboard Project 1993, ‘A’ Gallery London 1996, Whitechapel Open 1996, Chapter Arts Cardiff 1997, Royal West of England Academy 1999.) Recent work involves the use of non-photographic materials in the construction of the picture plane. Peter Kardia, Hester Westley and Malcolm Le Grice edited an exhibition catalog published by AC Black (London).

He exhibited works in the Royal Academy Summer Exhibition, 2010.

More recent exhibitions saw a shift in his approach from installations to painted panels of works based on themes around nature and environment. In 2013 his exhibition "Crossing Fields" shown at AND eventSpace, London the first series of painted panels mixed with photographic prints were shown. This was followed in 2015 the exhibition "Aground" held at the Sassoon Gallery, Folkestone. See images from this impressive installation. In the same year at 43 Inverness Street Gallery "Overlaid Landscapes" consisting of a series of photographic and painted panels were installed on two floors of the gallery.

Gallery

References

External links
http://roderickcoyne.and.org.uk/

1945 births
English sculptors
English male sculptors
English contemporary artists
English installation artists
Living people
Alumni of Saint Martin's School of Art
Academics of Saint Martin's School of Art